Azam and Muazzam Khan's  Tomb or Azam Khan and Muazzam Khan's Roza is a medieval brick tomb in Vasna, Ahmedabad, India.

The roza was built over graves of Persian brothers, Azam and Muazzam Khan, the archers and architects of Gujarat Sultanate era. They were credited as the architects of Sarkhej Roza. The roza was constructed in 1457 in solid bricks similar to Dariya Khan's Tomb. The garden and the mosque nearby no longer exists.

References 

Tombs in Ahmedabad
Monuments of National Importance in Gujarat